In graph theory, a connected graph is -edge-connected if it remains connected whenever fewer than  edges are removed.

The edge-connectivity of a graph is the largest  for which the graph is -edge-connected.

Edge connectivity and the enumeration of -edge-connected graphs was studied by Camille Jordan in 1869.

Formal definition

Let  be an arbitrary graph.
If subgraph  is connected for all  where , then G is k-edge-connected.
The smallest set X whose removal disconnects G is a minimum cut in G.

The edge connectivity version of Menger's theorem provides an alternative and equivalent characterization, in terms of edge-disjoint paths in the graph. If and only if every two vertices of G form the endpoints of k paths, no two of which share an edge with each other, then G is k-edge-connected. In one direction this is easy: if a system of paths like this exists, then every set X of fewer than k edges is disjoint from at least one of the paths, and the pair of vertices remains connected to each other even after X is deleted. In the other direction, the existence of a system of paths for each pair of vertices in a graph that cannot be disconnected by the removal of few edges can be proven using the max-flow min-cut theorem from the theory of network flows.

Related concepts
Minimum vertex degree gives a trivial upper bound on edge-connectivity.  That is, if a graph  is k-edge-connected then it is necessary that k ≤ δ(G), where δ(G) is the minimum degree of any vertex v ∈ V. Obviously, deleting all edges incident to a vertex, v,  would then disconnect v from the graph.

Edge connectivity is the dual concept to girth, the length of the shortest cycle in a graph, in the sense that the girth of a planar graph is the edge connectivity of its dual graph, and vice versa. These concepts are unified in matroid theory by the girth of a matroid, the size of the smallest dependent set in the matroid. For a graphic matroid, the matroid girth equals the girth of the underlying graph, while for a co-graphic matroid it equals the edge connectivity.

The 2-edge-connected graphs can also be characterized by the absence of bridges, by the existence of an ear decomposition, or by Robbins' theorem according to which these are exactly the graphs that have a strong orientation.

Computational aspects 
There is a polynomial-time algorithm to determine the largest k for which a graph G is k-edge-connected. A simple algorithm would, for every pair (u,v), determine the maximum flow from u to v with the capacity of all edges in G set to 1 for both directions. A graph is k-edge-connected if and only if the maximum flow from u to v is at least k for any pair (u,v), so k is the least u-v-flow among all (u,v).

If n is the number of vertices in the graph, this simple algorithm would perform  iterations of the Maximum flow problem, which can be solved in  time.

An improved algorithm will solve the maximum flow problem for every pair (u,v) where u is arbitrarily fixed while v varies
over all vertices.
it is bound to separate u from some other vertex. It can be further improved by an algorithm of Gabow that runs in worst case  time. 

The Karger–Stein variant of Karger's algorithm provides a faster randomized algorithm for determining the connectivity, with expected runtime .

See also 
 k-vertex-connected graph
 Connectivity (graph theory)
 Matching preclusion

References

Graph connectivity
Graph families